Mehradaran (also Romanized as Mehrādarān and Mehrāderān; also known as Mehr Āvarān and Mehrdarān) is a village in Baharestan Rural District, in the Central District of Nain County, Isfahan Province, Iran. At the 2006 census, its population was 120, in 47 families.

References 

Populated places in Nain County